Evelyn Evelyn are a fictional musical duo created by Amanda Palmer (of The Dresden Dolls) and Jason Webley. According to the backstory provided by Palmer and Webley, the duo consists of conjoined twin sisters (aka "Eva" and "Lyn"), Evelyn and Evelyn Neville, who were discovered in 2007 by Palmer and Webley. The twins are actually portrayed by Palmer and Webley, dressed in connected garments.

Discography
In 2007, the band released a 3-song, colored 7" vinyl record, along with a 6-track CD titled Evelyn Evelyn, which was released in a limited edition of 1,111 copies on Jason's label (11 records); it quickly sold out. The package also contains Amanda and Jason's story of how they met the Evelyns, as well as the process of recording the vinyl, and a sticker of the two-headed elephant, Bimba & Kimba.

A full-length album, Evelyn Evelyn, was released March 30, 2010, followed by a worldwide tour.

Albums
 Evelyn Evelyn (2010)

EPs
 Elephant Elephant (2007)

Bibliography
A book by these artists:

See also 
 Black Tape for a Blue Girl
 Dark cabaret and List of dark cabaret artists
The Art of Asking: How I Learned to Stop Worrying and Let People Help

References

External links

 Evelyn Evelyn review at Stuck Between Stations

Rock music groups from Washington (state)
Fictional conjoined twins
Rock music duos
American musical duos
Musical groups established in 2007
Dark cabaret musicians
Bands with fictional stage personas
Evelyn Evelyn